Skitsystem ("Fucking System" or "Fucking Society", literally "Shit System") is a Swedish crust punk band formed in early 1994. Their sound was heavily influenced by death metal and D-beat. The band members originally came from different death metal bands, bonding over a common interest in D-beat. Initially the group was a side-project of two members of At the Gates. The band announced in December 2007 that they were on indefinite hiatus. In November 2009, Skitsystem announced plans to play two shows in Gothenburg in late February 2010, with possibly more to follow.

Fredrik Wallenberg cites the group's initial influences as Anti Cimex, Asocial, Discharge, Doom and Disrupt.

Band members 
Current
 Fredrik Wallenberg – guitar, vocals (1994–present) (The Lurking Fear)
 Karl "Kalle" Persson – drums (1997–present) (Dispense)
 Martin Larsson – bass (2010–present) (Agrimonia, At the Gates, House of Usher, Macrodex, ex-Bombs of Hades)
 Andreas Axelsson – guitar (2019–present) (Disfear, The Deadbeats, Tormented, ex-Infestdead, ex-Total Terror, ex-Marduk, ex-Necronaut, ex-Edge of Sanity, ex-Incapacity, ex-The Dontcares, ex-Tortyr)

Former
 Alex Höglind – bass, vocals (1994–2010) (Golden Silver, Straight Edge My Ass)
 Tomas "Tompa" Lindberg – guitar, vocals (1994–2004) (At The Gates, Sign of Cain, The Lurking Fear, ex-Grotesque, ex-Infestation, Ben-Hur, Disfear, The Great Deceiver, ex-Lock Up, ex-Nightrage, ex-The Crown, ex-Necronaut, ex-Liers in Wait, ex-Sacrilege, ex-Conquest, ex-Hide, ex-Snotrocket, ex-World Without End)
 Adrian Erlandsson – drums (1994–1997) (The Haunted, The Lurking Fear, ex-Decameron, ex-H.E.A.L., ex-Needleye, ex-Terror, Nemhain, ex-Brujeria, ex-Cradle of Filth, ex-Netherbird, ex-Nifelheim, ex-Paradise Lost, ex-Riket, ex-Samsas Traum, ex-12 Ton Method, ex-Tenet, ex-Vallenfyre, ex-Hyperhug, ex-Penance (Swe), ex-Deathstars)
 Mikael "Micke" Kjellman – guitar, vocals (2003–2019) (Martyrdöd, Sanctuary in Blasphemy, ex-Neolithium, ex-Zonetripper)

Discography

Albums 
 1999 – Grå Värld / Svarta Tankar LP/CD
 2001 – Enkel Resa Till Rännstenen LP/CD
 2006 – Stigmata LP/CD

EPs 
 1995 – Profithysteri 7-inch|Profithysteri 7-inch
 1996 – Ondskans Ansikte 10-inch
 2003 – Allt E Skit

Split albums 
 1997 – Levande Lik 7-inch (split with Wolfpack)
 2002 – Det tunga missbrukets karga ingenmansland/Det eviga hatet 7-inch (split with Nasum)
 2006 – split 7-inch with Cyness

References

External links 
Official website (archived)

Swedish crust and d-beat groups
Musical groups from Gothenburg
Musical groups established in 1994
Swedish death metal musical groups